An Evening with Michael Bublé was the sixth concert tour by Canadian singer Michael Bublé. Launched in support of his tenth studio album, Love (2018), the tour began on February 13, 2019, in Tampa and is currently slated to play 151 shows throughout North America, Europe and Australia.

Background
Following the announcement of his son's cancer diagnosis, Bublé took a break from recording and touring. In the spring of 2018, it was revealed the singer completed recording his tenth album and retirement rumors began to spread, as he mentioned his family was his main priority and he no longer had the desire for fame. He performed a few spot stadium concerts in Dublin, London and Sydney during the summer of 2018. The tour was officially announced November 2018 on the singer's Instagram. Jokingly referred to as the "Don't Believe the Rumors Tour" or the "Don't Stop the Rumors Tour", Bublé and his publicist confirmed there were no plans to retire. Shortly after the tour was announced, PBS released the singer's concert special, "Tour Stop 148". Airing November 24, 2018, the special was featured as an installment of the station's long-running series, Great Performances.

During an interview with Billboard, Bublé expressed his excitement with returning to touring. He stated:"I'm going to go back to what I was made to do. I'm going to come back to a world that needs love and romance and laughter more than it has in a long time. I'm going to be a conduit to that. This is the greatest record I've ever made."

Critical reception
The tour received overwhelming praise from music critics and was treated as a welcomed return by the fans. Gabe Echazabal from Creative Loafing Tampa Bay described the concert at the Amalie Arena as a night full of love. He wrote: "Still, Bublé’s greatest asset — his voice — gained strength and richness as the night progressed. He was as potent during his stirring version of 'My Funny Valentine' as he was infectious during an homage to former singer and trumpet player Louis Prima. [...] Bublé turned the event into a dance party. As a nod to those who may feel uncomfortable or uneasy cutting loose, Bublé put no pressure on those folks".

In Pittsburgh, Patti Conley (of The Beaver County Times) followed the sentiments of Echazabal, describing the performance as heartfelt. She continued to say: "For two hours, Buble shared center stage with a 36-piece orchestra that impeccably accompanied and grounded him on a musical journey of life's highs and deepest lows. Buble sang and sashayed as if he were fingers on piano keys, running up steps to the orchestra, walking a runway touching outstretched hands and stopping to pose for selfies, and dancing — sort of — to whatever tempo the tunes demanded. He jumped like a jack-in-the-box".

Nancy J. Parisi of The Buffalo News says the show at the KeyBank Center was a triumphant return to form for Bublé. She goes on to say: "Thirty-four musicians, seated on four tiers, began 'Feeling Good' as an onstage circular monitor above undulated with red shimmering shapes. Bublé emerged in his signature blue suit, making his way down the staircase, singing, as the monitor's imagery morphed into a giant moon behind him. This arresting imagery flowed into a show highlighting what is known as The Great American Songbook, beloved classics, with a handful of Bublé pop compositions interspersed".

Setlist
This set list is representative of the performance on February 17, 2019, in Duluth, Georgia. It does not represent the set list at all concerts for the duration of the tour. 

"Feeling Good"
"Haven't Met You Yet"
"My Funny Valentine"
"I Only Have Eyes for You" 
"Sway"  
"Such a Night"
"(Up A) Lazy River"
"When You're Smiling"
"Fly Me to the Moon"
"You're Nobody till Somebody Loves You"
"When I Fall in Love"
"Love You Anymore"
"Forever Now"
"Home"
"Buona Sera Signorina"
"Just a Gigolo" / "I Ain't Got Nobody"
"You Never Can Tell"
"Save the Last Dance for Me"
"Nobody but Me"
"Cry Me a River"
Encore
"Where or When"
"Everything"
"Always on My Mind"

Tour dates

Cancelled shows

Notes

References

Michael Bublé concert tours
2019 concert tours
2020 concert tours
Concert tours postponed due to the COVID-19 pandemic
2021 concert tours
2022 concert tours